"Better Goff Dead" is the third episode of the American superhero television series Peacemaker, a spin-off from the 2021 film The Suicide Squad. The episode was written and directed by series creator James Gunn. It originally aired on HBO Max on January 13, 2022, alongside "A Whole New Whirled" and "Best Friends, For Never".

The series is set after the events of The Suicide Squad, and follows Christopher Smith / Peacemaker. Smith returns to his home but is forced to work with A.R.G.U.S. agents on a classified operation only known as "Project Butterfly". Smith also has to deal with his personal demons, including feeling haunted by memories of people he killed for "peace", as well as reconnecting with his estranged father. In the episode, the team prepares for their assassination target, where Smith learns more about the suspected "Butterflies".

The episode received positive reviews from critics, who praised the action sequences, directing, character development and performances.

Plot
As the team prepares for their mission, they notice Vigilante watching them and force him to walk away. Murn informs Smith that he must kill Senator Royland Goff, suspected of being a "Butterfly". He is also instructed to kill his family, despite not having enough evidence to suggest they might be Butterflies as well. Smith hesitates at the idea, despite claiming to kill anyone for "peace".

The team conducts a stakeout outside the Goff household, waiting for the family to arrive. The night falls and the family arrives at their house with Goff's bodyguard, Judomaster. Murn pressures Smith to aim and kill the family but Smith hesitates, delaying the mission until the next day. The team also notices that his family is showing alien-like behavior inside the house. While surveilling the house, Vigilante shows up, having followed and watched the team since their arrival, forcing Murn to allow him to stay to avoid ruining the operation.

The family gathers at the dining room, where they put a liquid on their bowl before they reveal immense tongues. Certain that they are Butterflies, Murn orders Smith to kill them. Smith hesitates in pulling the trigger, so Vigilante puts him aside and kills Goff's family. However, before he can kill him, they are attacked by Judomaster. Judomaster manages to knock Smith and Vigilante out and takes them inside the house with Goff's help. As the mission falls apart, Murn and Adebayo approach the area and rendezvous with Harcourt outside the house.

Inside the house, Goff sends Judomaster away to inform the events of the night and then proceeds to torture Vigilante, unmasking him as Adrian Chase. Smith refuses to disclose any information, so Goff tortures Chase by electrocution. Murn, Harcourt and Adebayo enter the house, discover the entrance to the basement and plant an explosive, which detonates after a short delay. The explosion propels Smith to escape and fight with Goff. Smith recovers a shotgun and kills Goff, with a butterfly-like creature emerging from Goff's corpse. Outside, Economos sees Judomaster escaping and rams his van into his car and then incapacitates him. Back at the van, the A.R.G.U.S. computers show that thousands of Butterflies are suspected of being around the world.

Production

Development
In July 2021, the episode's title was revealed as "Best Friends, For Never".

Casting
In February 2021, Nhut Lee would portray Judomaster in the series as a recurring role, with the episode marking his debut in the series.

Critical reception
"Better Goff Dead" received positive reviews from critics. Samantha Nelson of IGN gave the three-episode premiere a "great" 8 out of 10 rating and wrote in his verdict, "Peacemaker isn't quite as sharply written as Amazon's The Boys, but James Gunn is aiming for the same sort of subversive superhero show, using excessive violence and biting humor to deconstruct the failings of the genre. The three-episode premiere offers a goofy takedown of vigilantism while hinting at bigger and darker plots to come."

Jarrod Jones of The A.V. Club gave the three-episode premiere an "A-" grade and wrote, "Peacemaker is a stacked deck of fearsome insanity and there's a lot to accept in these first three episodes. It's vulgar, violent, prone to non sequitur, and has more than one dance sequence in store for you. But don't you dare let its ceaseless barrage of profanity, nudity, and slaughter dupe you into thinking otherwise: James Gunn's Peacemaker comes packing, among other things, a beating heart."

Alan Sepinwall of Rolling Stone gave the three-episode premiere a 4 star rating out of 5 and wrote, "Between the blood and guts, the slapstick, the political satire, and the musical digressions, there is a lot going on here. Yet the series functions as a sincere character study of its flawed hero — and the unfortunate souls who have to work alongside him — just enough for the joke to never quite wear thin. Even in a wildly oversaturated market for tales of hypermuscular men and women punching their way to justice, Peacemaker stands out. You'll wanna taste it, even the parts that are in incredibly bad taste." Alec Bojalad of Den of Geek gave the three-episode premiere a 4 star rating out of 5 and wrote, "Ultimately, Peacemaker is another win for the suddenly surprisingly competitive DC Comics TV landscape."

References

External links
 

Peacemaker (TV series) episodes
2022 American television episodes
Television episodes directed by James Gunn
Television episodes written by James Gunn